Brian Vandenbussche (born 24 September 1981) is a Belgian former professional footballer who played as a goalkeeper.

He formerly played for Sparta Rotterdam and ten seasons for Heerenveen.

Career
At the end of February 2019 it was confirmed, that Vandenbussche would join KSV Blankenberge ahead of the 2019–20 season. Vandenbussche also became a youth coach and individual coach at the club.

Honours
SC Heerenveen
KNVB Cup: 2009

Gent
Belgian Super Cup: 2015

References

External links
 Voetbal International profile 
 
 
 

1981 births
Living people
Belgian footballers
Association football goalkeepers
Belgium international footballers
Club Brugge KV players
Sparta Rotterdam players
SC Heerenveen players
K.A.A. Gent players
Cercle Brugge K.S.V. players
Challenger Pro League players
Eredivisie players
Eerste Divisie players
Belgian Pro League players
Belgian expatriate footballers
Belgian expatriate sportspeople in the Netherlands
Expatriate footballers in the Netherlands
People from Blankenberge
Footballers from West Flanders